Highway 140 (AR 140, Ark. 140, and Hwy. 140) is a designation for two east–west state highways in the Upper Arkansas Delta. One route of  begins at US Highway 63 Business (US 63B)/Highway 14 in Marked Tree and runs east to US 61 in Osceola. Both routes are maintained by the Arkansas State Highway and Transportation Department (AHTD).

Route description

Marked Tree to Osceola
AR 140 begins at US 63B in Marked Tree. It runs north with AR 14 until Lepanto, where the route crosses AR 135. AR 140 then heads northeast, briefly concurring with AR 136 and AR 181 individually before crossing under Interstate 55.

The route continues east to Osceola, meeting US 61.

Osceola
A separate section begins in Osceola and runs north to US 61 near the city limits.

History
Present-day Highway 140 was created on April 1, 1926 as State Road 40, one of the original Arkansas state highways. On November 25, 1958, the route was renumbered to Highway 140 after the American Association of State Highway Officials (AASHTO) designated Interstate 40 in Arkansas.

The original Highway 140 was created between March 1930 and June 1931 from US 65 in Dumas westward to Garrett Bridge. This route became part of AR 54 in 1937.

Major intersections

See also

 List of state highways in Arkansas

References

External links

140
Transportation in Poinsett County, Arkansas
Transportation in Mississippi County, Arkansas
Osceola, Arkansas